The 2012 Junior Africa Cup for Nations for Nations was the 10 edition of the Women's Africa Cup for Nations, was an international field hockey competition held from 13 to 20 October 2012 in Randburg Hockey Stadium, Johannesburg, South Africa.

The tournament served as a direct qualifier for the 2013 Junior World Cup, with the winner and runner-up qualifying.

Qualified teams

Results

Pool Stage

Matches

---

Source:

Classification Stage

Third and fourth place

Final

Statistics

Final standings

See also
 2012 Men's Junior Africa Cup for Nations

References

See also
FIH 2016 Junior African Cup

Hockey Junior Africa Cup
Junior Africa cup for Nations
Africa cup for Nations
Junior Africa cup for Nations
Sport in South Africa
International women's field hockey competitions hosted by South Africa
21st century in Johannesburg
Junior Africa cup for Nations